Straight from the Dec is the third studio album by the Ghetto Mafia. It was released on March 11, 1997 through Fully Loaded Records and was produced by the Ghetto Mafia themselves. Straight from the Dec found more success then the group's previous two album, having peaked at 49 on the Top R&B/Hip-Hop Albums and 17 on the Top Heatseekers. The album also spawned the Ghetto Mafia's first charting single "I Can Feel It" which made it to both the R&B and rap charts.

Track listing
"In da Paint"      
"Fool I Got Ya"     
"For The Good Times (Straight From The Dec)"
"Don't Turn Back"   
"Uncut"
"Who Wanna Test" 
"I Can Feel It"   
"Full Metal Jacket"   
"F.A.B."  
"Deal With The Devil"  
"Shouts"

Chart history

Straight from the Dec

I Can Feel It

References

External links
[ Straight from the Dec] at Allmusic
Straight from the Dec at Discogs
Straight from the Dec at Tower Records
[ Straight from the Dec] at Billboard

1997 albums
Ghetto Mafia albums